was a post–World War II Japanese photographer. He was born in Nara Prefecture to an affluent family. He followed his father's advice to become an engineer and enrolled at the Yoshino Technical High School. He continued his education in engineering at Tokyo Industrial Arts High School but later transferred to Nihon University's College of Art to major in film. After he was conscripted in World War 2, he decided to do photography.

After studying briefly at the Osaka College of Photographic Arts, Tsuda began to work at a photography studio, which like many at the time specialized in portraits. In 1948, he joined the Naniwa Photography Club.

Tsuda's early works can be characterized with his concern for construction and abstraction in the vein of subjective photography. But his later works focus more on expressing a humanistic narrative focused on nature.

Tsuda's works are included in the permanent collections of the Metropolitan Museum of Art (five prints), the J. Paul Getty Museum (one print), and the Tokyo Photographic Art Museum (five prints).

References 

1923 births
2014 deaths
Date of death missing
Place of death missing
Japanese photographers
Nihon University alumni
Artists from Nara Prefecture